Florian Zörgiebel (born 15 November 1965) is a German curler.

He participated in the demonstration curling events at the 1988 Winter Olympics, where the German team finished in seventh place.

At the national level, he is a two-time German men's champion curler (1990, 1991).

Teams

References

External links

 Video: 

1965 births
Living people
German male curlers
Curlers at the 1988 Winter Olympics
Olympic curlers of Germany
Swiss male curlers
Place of birth missing (living people)